Sir Arthur Robert Peel  (15 August 1861 – 7 October 1952) was a British diplomat who was envoy to Thailand, Brazil and Bulgaria.

Career
Arthur Robert Peel (grandson of William Yates Peel) was educated at Eton College and entered the Diplomatic Service as an attaché in 1886. He served in St Petersburg, Washington, D.C., Buenos Aires, The Hague, Lisbon and Montevideo, and was consul-general for the island of Crete, before being appointed Minister to Thailand (then called Siam) 1909–15, to Brazil 1915–18 and (after a year in London) to Bulgaria 1920–21.

Peel was awarded a knighthood (KCMG) in 1917.

Personal life
On 17 September 1921, at St Cuthbert's, Earls Court, London, Peel married Grace Landsberg, eldest daughter of Alberto Landsberg, a Brazilian banker of German Jewish ancestry.

Offices held

References

Links
PEEL, Sir Arthur, Who Was Who, A & C Black, 1920–2016 (online edition, Oxford University Press, 2014)
Obituary – Sir Arthur Peel, The Times, London, 9 October 1952, page 8

1861 births
1952 deaths
Arthur Robert Peel
People educated at Eton College
Ambassadors of the United Kingdom to Thailand
Ambassadors of the United Kingdom to Brazil
Ambassadors of the United Kingdom to Bulgaria
Knights Commander of the Order of St Michael and St George